Saissetia is a genus of soft scale insects in the family Coccidae. There are at least four described species in Saissetia.

Species
 Saissetia coffeae (Walker, 1852) (hemispherical scale)
 Saissetia miranda (Cockerell and Parrott, 1899)
 Saissetia neglecta De Lotto, 1969
 Saissetia oleae (Olivier, 1791)

References

Further reading

 
 
 
 

Sternorrhyncha genera
Coccidae